Chionodes acerella is a moth in the family Gelechiidae. It is found in North America, where it has been recorded from British Columbia.

The larvae feed on Acer species.

References

Chionodes
Moths described in 1967
Moths of North America